Merve Aydın (born 10 March 1994) is a Turkish professional basketball player for Fenerbahçe.

Career
She began with basketball playing at the age of ten. Despite her height disadvantage, she became a successful player. In the 2008–09 season at the age of fourteen, Merve Aydın was admitted to the senior team of Mersin B.B. SK becoming the youngest ever player in the Turkish Women's Basketball League. In the 2012–13 season, she was transferred back to Mersin B.B. after playing in the İstanbul Üniversitesi SK for some time.

Aydın was member of the national team at the 2011 FIBA Europe Under-18 Championship for Women, which ranked 7th. She won the bronze medal in 2012 and 2013 at FIBA Europe Under-20 Championship for Women with the national team.

Honors

Individual
 2011 Turkey Women's All-Star Talent

National
FIBA Europe Under-20 Championship for Women
2012 – 
2013 –

See also
Turkish women in sports

References

External links
Statistics at TBL.org.tr

1994 births
Living people
Hatay Büyükşehir Belediyesi (women's basketball) players
Mersin Büyükşehir Belediyesi women's basketball players
Point guards
Sportspeople from Mersin
Turkish women's basketball players
Galatasaray S.K. (women's basketball) players
Fenerbahçe women's basketball players